Echinimonas is a Gram-negative, facultatively anaerobic and motile genus of bacteria from the family of Vibrionaceae with on known species Echinimonas agarilytica. Echinimonas agarilytica has been isolated from the sea urchin Strongylocentrotus intermedius.

References

Vibrionales
Bacteria genera
Monotypic bacteria genera
Taxa described in 2013